Highland Avenue Historic District may refer to:

Highland Avenue Historic District (Birmingham, Alabama), listed on the National Register of Historic Places in Birmingham, Alabama  
Highland Avenue Historic District (Lexington, Missouri), listed on the National Register of Historic Places in Lafayette County, Missouri